Ole Schemion (born 12 September 1992) is a German professional poker player from Berlin, Germany. Schemion primarily plays in Europe.

Poker
In 2011, Schemion won his first tournament at the age of 19, in one of the events during European Poker Tour(EPT) Berlin. He has since won over 10 titles including the EPT Sanremo High Roller for $366,124. His largest cash winning was the 2016 € Super High Roller #16 in Monaco.

Success during the period of 2013-2015 earned Schemion the #1 position on the Global Poker Index (GPI), with 4083.21 points, in the January 2015 rankings. Schemion was the highest ranked player in open events for both 2013 and 2014. , he is ranked 49th on the GPI, and has total live tournament winnings exceed $16,246,351, putting him in 5th place on the Germany All-Time Money List.

In October 13, 2019, Ole Schemion won the $1,050 Sunday Supersonic and $1,050 Sunday Warm-Up tournaments on the same evening.

He's had multiple success in online multi-table tournaments, under the alias “wizowizo”.

Personal life
Schemion was born in Berlin, Germany and currently resides in Vienna, Austria.

References

External links 
Ole Schemion Hendon Mob profile

1992 births
German poker players
World Poker Tour winners
People from Berlin
Living people